Józef Jan Klemens Pomiankowski (23 November 1866 – 23 January 1929) was a lieutenant field marshal of the Austro-Hungarian Army and later general of the Polish Armed Forces. He was the military representative of the Austro-Hungarian military mission in the Ottoman Empire in the World War I, during which he was in charge of shaping Austrian policy on the Orient, often in competition with the allied German Empire.

Early life
Józef Pomiankowski was born in Jaroslau from a Polish family originated from the Lesser Poland historical region (also known in XIX century as Galicia province after the Partitions of Poland). He entered the military lower secondary school in Güns, and four years later he enrolled the military upper secondary school in Mährisch Weißkirchen, and from 1883 to 1886 he graduated from the Imperial and Royal Technical Military Academy in Vienna.

Military career

Early career and the Ottoman Empire
In November 1901, he received the important post of military attaché in Belgrade to the Kingdom of Serbia. There he acted in the military field and also made appropriate economic and political-strategic assessments, which he reported to Vienna in representing the Austro–Serbian relations. He was also able to demonstrate success in the field of intelligence and gather information about Serbian nationalist/terrorist groups in Macedonia and Bosnia, who had sought to separate Bosnia away from Austria. Here, he used experiences to urge for immediate actions against "Serbian agitation" in vigorous and direct measures.

In the end of 1909, he started as a colonel as a military attaché in Constantinople where he was also responsible for the Balkan issues, including Kingdom of Greece, and was later responsible for the disastrous First Balkan War, where he miscalculated the determination of Balkan nations against the Ottoman Empire.

Also, during the time he worked in the Ottoman Empire, he had openly made contact with various figures of the Young Turks, including Talaat Pasha, Enver Pasha and Djemal Pasha. It was the time he working here, he had taken a clear insight about the way the Young Turks functioned and made decisions, and in 1909, he found evidence that the Ottoman government was planning for a total extermination of non-Muslim people, eventually his prophecy turned real with the Armenian genocide, Assyrian genocide and Greek genocide occurred. He later provided testimonies over the Armenian Genocide.

World War I
With the outbreak of World War I, Pomiankowski, now a major general, served as a military plenipotentiary and also became the head of the Austro-Hungarian military mission in the Ottoman Empire and a junior partner of the German military mission under Otto Liman von Sanders. As such, he tried to use the differences between the Germans and the Ottomans in order to assert Austria-Hungary's political and economic interests in the Orient despite the limited means of power. Together with Foreign Minister Leopold Berchtold and the ambassador of the monarchy in Constantinople, Johann von Pallavicini, whom Pomiankowski built a strong friendship, Pomiankowski endeavored to pursue an independent policy towards the Orient to compete with the more powerful Germany. Due to this competitive policy persuaded by Pomiankowski, there had been a brief brawl between German and Austrian governments in 1917 in question over influences and power Austria played undermining Germany.

Pomiankowski was not only active in the military, but also actively shaped Austrian policy on the Orient on site, worked as a diplomat, head of his own intelligence service, propagandist, cultural ambassador, economist and diplomat. He helped set up the "Orient Department" in 1917 in order not to fall behind the overpowering partner Germany in the economic exploitation of the Balkans and the Ottoman Empire. German officials in Constantinople tried in vain to intervene with Kaiser Wilhelm II or German chief of staff Conrad to replace their Austrian opponent, believing Pomiankowski was undermining German cooperation with Turkey.

Pomiankowski, like many major Polish-born figures before, strongly valued the Turks for their military bravery, but blamed Islam for the backwardness of the empire that prohibited modernization of Turkey. He resented German policy of trying to mobilize Muslims to fight against the Entente because religious fragmentation of Islam meant that joint mobilization was not possible. Like Pallavicini, he was also skeptical of the Austrian mission to the Orient by Alois Musil and Archduke Hubert Salvator, from September to November 1917.

Since 1917, he was promoted to lieutenant field marshal, where he coordinated the monarchy's troops in the unsuccessful fighting on the Palestine front after a brief deployment on the Italian front from June 1917.

Armenian genocide
Even though Pomiankowski had a favorable opinion on the Turks in general, he had largely disapproved the Armenian genocide and was one of the earliest figures to realize the true scale of the genocide, which he was greatly appalled. In May 1916, he visited the eastern Anatolian areas where the genocide occurred and reported it to Vienna, Pomiankowski accused Enver Pasha of being complicit, however his tentative diplomatic attempts to obtain security for the persecuted Armenians were unsuccessful. On the other hand, he defended the German colleagues after American ambassador to Turkey, Henry Morgenthau Sr., accused the Germans of behind the idea of deportations and genocide on Armenians. He later called it "barbaric" in his memoirs and sympathized with the Armenians.

Post-World War I and resurrection of Poland
After the end of the war, Pomiankowski organized the return transport of 200 officers and 1,050 soldiers with an Italian ship via Trieste to Austria. With Ottoman support, he broke up a revolution attempt by 200 soldiers who tried to install soldiers' councils and sent them to the Austrian-occupied Odessa by ship. But with the collapse of the Habsburg monarchy, he immediately followed the call of Józef Piłsudski for the resurrection of Poland from Austrian, German and Russian occupation. He became Polish military representative for Sweden, Denmark and Norway in Stockholm and later head of the military purchasing commission for war materials in Paris, before taking Polish citizenship on 25 March 1919. Shortly afterwards, he helped organizing Polish Army to fight the Germans and Austrians, as well as against the Ukrainians, Czechoslovaks and most importantly, against the Bolsheviks, where his effort was paid with the foundation of the Second Polish Republic. He retired from the military in January 1922.

Personal life
He was married and had two daughters, Maria and Janina, born in 1904 and 1905; the family lived in Lemberg and Vienna.

In 1924 to 1927, he wrote the book Der Zusammenbruch des Ottomanischen Reiches (The Fall of the Ottoman Empire), detailed about the relations between Austria-Hungary to the Ottoman Empire in the final days. It was recommended by historian Herbert W. Duda.

He died on 21 January 1929 in Lwów, where he resigned and resettled, and was buried in the Łyczakowski Cemetery.

See also
Armenia–Poland relations
Witnesses and testimonies of the Armenian genocide

References

Further reading

Austrian soldiers
Austrian lieutenant field marshals
Austro-Hungarian military personnel
Polish soldiers
Polish generals
Austrian orientalists
Polish orientalists
1866 births
1929 deaths
Witnesses of the Armenian genocide
People from Jarosław
Polish people of World War I
Theresian Military Academy alumni